Chimdum Johnny Mez (born November 25, 1992) is an American soccer player who plays as a forward.

Career

College and amateur
Mez played four years of college soccer at California State University, Sacramento between 2010 and 2014, including a redshirted year in 2011. During his time with Sac State, Mez made 68 appearances, scoring 10 goals and tallying 4 assists.

While playing at college, Mez appeared for USL PDL side Los Angeles Misioneros in 2013.

Professional
On January 20, 2015, Mez was selected 66th overall in the 2015 MLS SuperDraft by San Jose Earthquakes. However, he was not signed by the club.

In 2016, Mez played with NPSL side Sacramento Gold.

Following a short trial, Mez moved to AD Escazuceña of the Segunda División de Costa Rica in 2017. In 2019, Mez also played for Fútbol Consultants Desamparados in Costa Rica.

In January 2020, Mez signed for his first fully professional team, joining Liga FPD side Santos de Guápiles.

Personal
Mez's cousin is fellow professional soccer player Amobi Okugo.

References

External links
Sac State bio

1992 births
Living people
American soccer players
Soccer players from California
Association football forwards
Sacramento State Hornets men's soccer players
USL League Two players
National Premier Soccer League players
San Jose Earthquakes draft picks
American expatriate soccer players
Expatriate footballers in Costa Rica
Sacramento Gold FC players